Amihai (lit. My nation lives), sometimes spelled Amichai or Amichay, is a Hebrew name. It may refer to one of the following:

Places
 Amihai, an Israeli West Bank settlement

People
As surname
 Gideon Amichay (1963–), Israeli advertising executive
 Yehuda Amichai (1924–2000), Israeli poet

As first name
 Amihai Grosz (1979–), Israeli violinist
 Amihai Mazar (1942–), Israeli archaeologist
 Amichai Paglin (1922–1978), Israeli businessman and militant
 Amichai Chasson (1987–), Israeli poet, curator and filmmaker.

Organizations
 Amihai, an Israeli publishing house
 Amihai, an Israeli NGO for children with special needs